There is a significant Russian population in Germany (German: Deutschrussen, Russlanddeutsche or Russischsprachige in Deutschland). The collapse of the Soviet Union in 1991 triggered mass immigration to the West, with Germany being the top destination, mostly for economic and ethnic reasons. Russians (German Russians) are the 3rd largest migrant group in Germany.

Soviet and post-Soviet emigration from Russia
German population data  records 1,213,000 Russian migrants residing in Germany—this includes current and former citizens of the Russian Federation as well as former citizens of the Soviet Union. The Russian Ministry of Foreign Affairs reports that about 3,500,000 speakers of Russian live in Germany, split largely into three ethnic groups:

 ethnic Russians
 Russians descended from German migrants to the East (known as Aussiedler, Spätaussiedler and Russlanddeutsche (Russian Germans, Germans from Russia))
 Russian Jews

Immigration to Germany surged in the late 1980s and early 1990s. According to the Global Commission on International Migration research, "In the 1990s ethnic Germans and Jews comprised the largest components of emigration, and the most attractive destinations were Germany, Israel and the United States." Between 1992 and 2000 Germany purportedly received 550,000 emigrants from Russia, 60% of the total amount emigrating to the three main destinations.

Ethnic background

Aussiedler from Russia

Earlier in history, particularly during the 17th century, a number of Germans migrated to Russia. Article 116 of Germany's Basic Law, approved in 1949, provides individuals of German heritage with the right of return to Germany and the means to acquire German citizenship if they suffered persecution after the Second World War as a result of their German heritage. As a result, roughly 3.6 million ethnic Germans moved to West Germany between 1950 and 1996. These German descendants increasingly petitioned to emigrate to Germany under the First Secretary of the Communist Party of the Soviet Union Nikita Khrushchev.  According to historian John Glad, by 1957 the petitioners, commonly known as "Aussiedler" (singular and plural) or transferred settlers, filed over 100,000 applications a year to migrate to West Germany; several thousand returned in the 1970s. The flow of Aussiedler increased with the breakup of the Soviet Union. For instance, between 1992 and 2007, a total of 1,797,084 ethnic Germans from the former USSR emigrated to Germany. Of this total number 923,902 were from Kazakhstan, 693,348 were from Russia, 73,460 were from Kyrgyzstan, 40,560 from Ukraine, 27,035 from Uzbekistan, and 14,578 from Tajikistan. Numbers peaked in 1994–213,214 Aussiedler—and then gradually began to decline.  The number of non-German relatives who emigrated along with them is not known, but many if not most are presumably members of Germany's ethnic Russian community (see below). The number of emigrated Aussiedler fluctuates as many retained housing in the Former Soviet Union—some are presumed to have returned to their residences in Former Soviet Republics.

Soviet Jews
After the Second World War Germany's Jewish population was 15,000, a small percentage of the country's pre-war Jewish population of 500,000. That number grew to 30,000 by the late 1980s. Then between 1991 and 2005, more than 200,000 Jews from the former Soviet Union moved to Germany. In total, the Berman Jewish DataBank estimates that over 225,000 Jews from the Former Soviet Union (Russia and various republics) immigrated to Germany between 1989 and 2012. 

With most Russian Jews in general being Ashkenazi Jews, once arrived in Germany, many of them had the advantage of having grown up speaking Yiddish in Russia (the traditional Judaeo-German language of Ashkenazi Jews) as well as Russian. Thus, because of their Yiddish, they picked up the German language easily. This contrasted to German Russian immigrants to Germany who in Russia had only spoken Russian despite their ethnic German heritage. 

The Berman Jewish DataBank estimates "Germany's core Jewish population at 118,000 in 2013," of which all but about 5,000-6,000 are post-Soviet immigrants; the community numbers about 250,000 if non-Halachic-Jewish relatives are included." Growth began to diminish in 2005 when the German government replaced the special quota immigration law (Kontingentsflüchtlingsgesetz) with more restrictive rules (Zuwanderungsgesetz).

Other Russian speakers
Other Russian speakers in Germany fall into a few different categories. The German Statistisches Bundesamt (Federal Statistical Office) reported the following figures for Russian speakers from the year 2000: legal aliens (365,415), political asylees (20,000), students (7,431), family members of German citizens (10,000–15,000), special workers in fields of science and culture (5,000–10,000), and diplomatic corps (5,000). The largest percentage comes from the "legal alien" category.  The vast majority of the legal aliens, who are mainly ethnic Russians (with smaller numbers of Belarusians, Ukrainians, and other groups) are family members of returnees (Aussiedler and Soviet Jews), but who have yet to receive German citizenship. Many of the Russian-speakers actually moved to Germany during the DDR years, and remained after German reunification. This has led to a high concentration of Russian citizens in the new states of Germany.

Integration into German society
Most Russian-Germans have assimilated and integrated well into German society. As with most other immigrant groups, there remain some contemporary issues. German authorities have been concerned that the high number of Russian immigrants self-segregating in certain neighborhoods hinders social integration.  This has led to restrictions on immigration from Russia and the former Soviet Union. Other issues have included crime, drugs, poverty and unemployment.

The Aussiedler have raised many issues. Although they were expected to assimilate rapidly into German society, Aussiedler and their descendants are struggling with their identity, and most consider themselves Russian. In Russia, due to outside pressure, they had become assimilated into Russian society, in most cases speaking Russian as their first or only language, and this has made their return difficult.

A 2006 study by the German Youth Institute revealed that Russian-Germans face high levels of prejudice and intolerance in Germany, ranging from low job opportunities, to problems in the real estate market.

A 2020 survey found that Aussiedler generally feel more belonging to Germany, their state and even city than their country of origin.

Notable individuals

See also

 Germany–Russia relations
 Demographics of Germany

References 

Ethnic groups in Germany
Germany
Germany–Russia relations